This is a list of the National Register of Historic Places listings in Winneshiek County, Iowa.

This is intended to be a complete list of the properties and districts on the National Register of Historic Places in Winneshiek County, Iowa, United States. Latitude and longitude coordinates are provided for many National Register properties and districts; these locations may be seen together in a map.

There are 33 properties and districts listed on the National Register in the county. Five other properties have been delisted.

|}

Former listings
Five properties were once listed on the Register, but have been removed:

|}

See also

 List of National Historic Landmarks in Iowa
 National Register of Historic Places listings in Iowa
 Listings in neighboring counties: Allamakee, Chickasaw, Clayton, Fayette, Fillmore (MN), Houston (MN), Howard

References

Winneshiek
 
Buildings and structures in Winneshiek County, Iowa